Hansjürgen Doss is a German politician of the Christian Democratic Union (CDU) and former member of the German Bundestag.

Life 
Doss joined the CDU in 1965 and was elected to the state executive of the CDU Rhineland-Palatinate. Doss was a member of the city council of Mainz from 1979 to 1981. From January to August 1981 he was a member of the Rhineland-Palatinate state parliament. He was a member of the German Bundestag from 20 July 1981, when he succeeded Elmar Pieroth, who had resigned, until 2002. He was always elected to the Bundestag via the Rhineland-Palatinate state list. From 1990 to 2002, he was chairman of the parliamentary group for medium-sized businesses of the CDU/CSU parliamentary group and was a member of the group's executive committee.

References 

1936 births
Living people
Members of the Bundestag for Rhineland-Palatinate
Members of the Bundestag 1998–2002
Members of the Bundestag 1994–1998
Members of the Bundestag 1990–1994
Members of the Bundestag 1987–1990
Members of the Bundestag 1983–1987
Members of the Bundestag 1980–1983
Members of the Bundestag for the Christian Democratic Union of Germany
Members of the Landtag of Rhineland-Palatinate